Classic Objects is the eighth solo studio album by Norwegian musician Jenny Hval, released 11 March 2022 on 4AD. The album was produced by Hval, with co-production by Kyrre Laastad.

Recording
Classic Objects was written, performed, arranged, and recorded in Øra Studio in Trondheim.

Critical reception

Classic Objects received widespread acclaim from music critics. At Metacritic, which assigns a normalized rating out of 100 to reviews from mainstream critics, the album received an average score of 85 based on 11 reviews, indicating "universal acclaim".

Track listing

Personnel
Credits adapted from the liner notes of Classic Objects.
Jenny Hval – vocals, background vocals, composer, arranger, instruments, production, programming (all tracks), concept, recording
Kyrre Laastad – co-production, guitar (tracks 1, 7), bass guitar (tracks 2, 6, 8), keyboards (track 1), drums (track 4, 6), recording
Håvard Volden – guitar (tracks 1–3, 7, 8), bass guitar (tracks 3, 4), keyboards (tracks 5–7)
Vivian Wang – additional vocals (track 6), keyboards (track 3), recording
Natali Abrahamsen Garner – additional vocals (tracks 2, 6, 8), recording
Johan Lindvall – keyboards, piano (track 8)
Daniel Meyer Grønvold – guitar (tracks 1–4, 7, 8)
Hans Hulbækmo – percussion (tracks 1–6, 8), drums (track 6, 8)
Annie Bielski – additional lyrics, artwork, concept, photography
Even Ormestad – recording (track 8)
Lasse Marhaug – graphic design, photography
Heba Kadry – mixing, mastering

Charts

References

2022 albums
Jenny Hval albums
4AD albums